Palant is a Polish game similar to American baseball, played using a wooden stick such as a broom handle and rubber balls. Similar games are German Schlagball, Russian lapta and Romanian oină.

In the United States
In his book God's Playground, Norman Davies suggests that baseball may have developed from Palant as played by the first Polish immigrants, such as the Jamestown Polish craftsmen, who arrived in October 1608 on the emigrant ship Mary and Margaret, which brought the first Polish settlers into Jamestown, Virginia. According to Davies, those Polish artisans were said to be responsible for the continent's first industrial strike, and in the game of Palant, for the invention of Baseball.

However, many Native American people played a similar game well before the arrival in the Americas of European people, as recorded in Cherokee sources.

Rules
In Palant, the players are divided into two teams of 7 to 15 players. The playing field is 25 by 60 meters in size, and the wooden stick has 60–88 centimeters in length. You have to draw the "heaven" and "hell" fields. Reflecting team is trying to maintain as long as possible to "heaven" field for customs clearance wooden stick and finish the race. Team being on the "hell" field seeks to obtain the "heaven". For this purpose, trying to catch the ball in his hands as soon as possible to reject the heaven, so as to withhold as many players on the "hell". The team of "heaven" is set before the line "heaven" and the team "hell" for the line drawn to pierce the ball. The duration of the game twice after 20 minutes, you can set a limit being in "heaven" and "hell." The players located on the "heaven" bounce the ball behind the line designated with a wooden stick. Reflection is important when the ball sailed above the ground or on the ground the center line. Reflection is invalid when Batsman release the wooden stick of the hand, himself not toss balls, or he will not hit the ball.

After contacting the ball by a player in "heaven" pushes the stick and begins to defeat the base, task players in "hell" as soon as possible transfer balls to heaven. If a player misses, not strikes are set to run. For each running a yields one point. When a team from "hell" catch the ball in one hand directly during the flight that goes to heaven. Caught in the basket (with both hands) gets one point. These rules can vary and change. When playing e.g. After 5 minutes upstairs (in heaven) and players from hell will not make the transition a n-el informs that the sides. The winning team that has the greatest number of points in a given time.

Bibliography

References

Polish games
Ball and bat games
History of baseball in the United States
Polish-American history